Horse crippler is a common name for several cacti and may refer to:

Echinocactus texensis, native to New Mexico, Oklahoma, and Texas
Grusonia parishii, native to California, Nevada, and Arizona